Society znanost.org is a NGO operating mainly in Croatia. Its main focus is in promoting education, science and knowledge-based values. The word znanost in Croatian means "science".

Governance 
 Damir Kovačić - current president
 Hrvoje Meštrić - current vice-president
 Executive board members: Slaven Garaj, Ana Bedalov, Damir Kovačić (president), Hrvoje Meštrić (vice-president), Petar Mimica, Duje Bonacci, Vladimir Ivković
 Project council: Damir Kovačić, Petar Mimica 
 Executive Director: Ana Bedalov

Alumni 
 Mario Jurić
 Dejan Vinković
 Branimir Lukić

History 
znanost.org was founded in February 2002 by a group of a recent graduates from the University of Zagreb, Croatia.  Activities during the first year and a half of operation were mostly limited to providing popular science texts. The first major step towards a broader public engagement was the participation in organization of the First Croatian Science Festival for the Croatian national daily newspaper Vjesnik.

. The society was contracted by the organizers (Technical Museum in Zagreb, British Council Croatia and the former Croatian Ministry of Science and Technology, since early 2004 part of the Ministry of Science, Education and Sports) to build a web site and help organize media coverage for the event.

Activities 
Projects include:
 Connect::Portal - free and independent Internet news site, and one of the leading Croatian public news media covering science and technology policy
 connect - Croatian professional network of scientists, experts, educators and students
 Nebo na poklon - educational outreach project
 Astrophysical Initiative in Dalmatia - comprehensive program of creating an astrophysics centre of excellence in Dalmatia
 INDECS - Interdisciplinary Description of Complex Systems, a scientific journal

A scientific paper Towards quantitative tools for analysing qualitative properties of virtual communities  published in INDECS 2(2) contains a simple quantitative analysis of the inner dynamics of znanost.org between March 2003 and January 2004.

See also 
 Nebo na poklon (Presenting the Skies), education project

External links 
 znanost.org official web page
 Faculty of Science, University of Zagreb
 Technical Museum in Zagreb
 British Council Croatia
 Croatian Ministry of Science, Education and Sports

Scientific organizations based in Croatia
Organizations established in 2002
2002 establishments in Croatia